The following is the list of Belgian Pro League top scorers by season, since the inception of the Belgian First Division A in 1895 until the present day.

Arthur Ceuleers and Jules Van Craen hold the record for most goals in a single season at 41. Erwin Vandenbergh holds the record for most awards won, with six wins. The most recent top scorer of the Belgian First Division A is Hamdi Harbaoui.

Criteria
In recent years, the criteria to determine the top scorer in the Belgian First Division A have been extended, making it nearly impossible to have two or more shared winners in a season
The criteria are currently as follows, in order:
 Number of goals scored
 Number of away goals scored
 Number of minutes played
 Number of assists
 Number of goals scored, not taking into account penalty kicks

The ranking is computed after each matchday. Until matchday three, the player who scored the most goals during the previous season will play with the image of a "golden bull" on his back. Thereafter, each matchday the leader in the standings will get the image on his shirt.
The final standings are computed upon conclusion of the championship playoffs and the Europa League playoffs. The test matches to determine the final team going to the Europa League are not taken into account.

List of top scorers

Notes

 1 Originally, Rik Coppens was credited with the title of top scorer for the 1951–52 season with 22 goals, until in 2011 a fan noticed that Jozef Mannaerts had actually scored 23 goals that season and the title changed hands.
 2 Josip Weber changed nationality during the 1993–94 season.
 3 Starting with the 2009–10 season, only 30 games were played in the regular competition to decide upon the title of topscorer. In the first season, the title of top scorer was decided immediately after these 30 games. However, from the season 2010–11 on, the goals scored during the playoffs will count. If this rule had been in place during the 2009–10 season, Dorge Kouemaha would have been top scorer instead of Lukaku.
 4 Nigerian striker Henry Onyekuru also scored 22 goals for Eupen, but the top scorer award was given to Teodorczyk as he scored more away goals than Onyekuru.
 5 Harbaoui transferred from Anderlecht to Zulte Waregem during the winter transfer window. He scored 3 and 19 goals for respectively Anderlecht and Zulte Waregem over the course of the whole season.
 6 The 2019–20 Belgian First Division A was stopped after 29 of 40 matches played due to the COVID-19 pandemic. At that point, both Mbokani and Canadian striker Jonathan David had scored 18 goals but Mbokani won the top scorer award as he scored more away goals than David.

References

  - List of top scorers

Top scorers
Top scorers
Belgium